Raymond George Clarke (19 July 1908 – 23 October 1971) was an Australian rules footballer who played with North Melbourne in the Victorian Football League (VFL).

External links 

1908 births
1971 deaths
Australian rules footballers from Victoria (Australia)
North Melbourne Football Club players